The fourth season of the television series Angel, the spin-off of Buffy the Vampire Slayer, premiered on October 6, 2002 on The WB and concluded its 22-episode season on May 7, 2003. The season aired in a new timeslot, Sundays at 9:00 pm ET, and then relocated to Wednesdays at 9:00 pm ET, beginning with "Habeas Corpses".

Cast and characters

Main cast 
 David Boreanaz as Angel
 Charisma Carpenter as Cordelia Chase
 J. August Richards as Charles Gunn
 Amy Acker as Winifred "Fred" Burkle
 Vincent Kartheiser as Connor
 Andy Hallett as Lorne
 Alexis Denisof as Wesley Wyndam-Pryce

Recurring cast 
 Stephanie Romanov as Lilah Morgan
 Vladimir Kulich as The Beast
 Gina Torres as Jasmine
 Alexa Davalos as Gwen Raiden
 Eliza Dushku as Faith
 Daniel Dae Kim as Gavin Park

Guest cast 
 Julie Benz as Darla
 David Denman as Skip
 Alyson Hannigan as Willow Rosenberg
 Laurel Holloman as Justine Cooper
 John Rubinstein as Linwood Murrow
 Jonathan M. Woodward as Knox

Crew 
Series creator Joss Whedon remained as the sole executive producer of the show after David Greenwalt left at the end of season three to produce the ABC series Miracles after his contract with 20th Century Fox was up. He stayed on as a consulting producer for the remainder of the series. At the start of the season, David Simkins was made showrunner and executive producer, but after three months, he left the show due to "creative differences" and is not credited in any episodes. Jeffrey Bell was promoted to co-executive producer and assumed the role of showrunner for the season. Tim Minear also left the series to run Whedon's new series Firefly but, like Greenwalt, stayed on as a consulting producer, and wrote and directed the season finale "Home". Whedon would write and direct only one episode of the season, "Spin the Bottle", because of his commitments to the first season of Firefly and the final season of Buffy the Vampire Slayer.

Steven S. DeKnight, who had written for Buffy during seasons five and six, moved over to Angel where he stayed for the remainder of the show's run. He wrote or co-wrote six episodes of the season, including the season premiere and also directed his debut episode; "Inside Out". Buffy writer-producer David Fury joined as a consulting producer (taking over Marti Noxon's role) and ended up writing four episodes. Mere Smith was promoted to executive story editor and wrote or co-wrote four episodes. Elizabeth Craft and Sarah Fain joined the show as staff writers and wrote or co-wrote five episodes. Firefly writer Ben Edlund was hired as a producer towards the end of the season, following the cancellation of Firefly.

Episodes

Reception 
The fourth season was nominated for five Saturn Awards – Best Network Television Series, Best Actress in a Television Series (Charisma Carpenter), Best Supporting Actor in a Television Series (Alexis Denisof), Best Supporting Actress in a Television Series (Amy Acker), and David Boreanaz won for Best Actor in a Television Series. The season was also nominated for four Satellite Awards – David Boreanaz for Best Actor – Television Series Drama, Andy Hallett for Best Supporting Actor – Television Series Drama, and Amy Acker and Gina Torres both for Best Supporting Actress – Television Series Drama.

The Futon Critic named "Spin the Bottle" the 33rd best episode of 2002 and "Peace Out" the 25th best episode of 2003.

The fourth season averaged 3.7 million viewers, slightly lower than the seventh and final season of Buffy.

DVD release 
Angel: The Complete Fourth Season was released on DVD in region 1 on September 7, 2004 and in region 2 on April 1, 2004. The DVD includes all 22 episodes on 6 discs presented in anamorphic widescreen 1.78:1 aspect ratio. Special features on the DVD include seven commentary tracks—"The House Always Wins" by writer David Fury and actor Andy Hallett; "Spin the Bottle" by writer/director Joss Whedon and actor Alexis Denisof; "Apocalypse, Nowish" by writer Steven S. DeKnight and director Vern Gillum; "Orpheus" by co-executive producer Jeffrey Bell and director Terrence O'Hara; "Inside Out" by writer/director Steven S. DeKnight; "The Magic Bullet" by writer/director Jeffrey Bell; and "Home" by writer/director Tim Minear. Featurettes include, "Angel and the Apocalypse", which details how they depicted the apocalypse on the show; "Unplugged: Season 4 Outtakes", a series of outtakes from the season; "Last Looks: The Hyperion Hotel", a set tour of the Hyperion Hotel; "Fatal Beauty and the Beast", a look at the villains of the season; "Malice in Wonderland: Wolfram & Hart", a look at the law firm and its importance in the show; and "Prophecies: Season 4 Overview", a summary of the season featuring interviews with cast and crew members.

References

External links 
 

Angel (1999 TV series)
 
2002 American television seasons
2003 American television seasons